The Echinothuriidae are a family of sea urchins in the order Echinothurioida. 
Due to their soft skeletons, most are called "leather urchins", but species in the genus Asthenosoma are also known as "fire urchins" due to their bright colors and painful, venomous sting.

Description and characteristics 
These sea urchins have a disc-like body, more or less bulging, structured by a flexible test, which is nearly unique among sea urchins. Most species can grow quite big and live in deep seas, though some genera contain shallow species (especially Asthenosoma).

The test is composed of thin and weakly calcified plates, not always continuous. The spines are attached to perforated and uncrenulated tubercles. Spines from the oral face are ending with a hyaline hoof, which allows walking on soft substrate. 
The jaw (Aristotle's lantern) has five aulodont teeth.

This family seems to have appeared at the end of the Cretaceous.

Taxonomy
The World Echinoidea Database recognises these genera:
 Subfamily Echinothuriinae Thomson, 1872a
 genus Araeosoma Mortensen, 1903b - 19 current species and two fossils
 genus Asthenosoma Grube, 1868 - six current species and one fossil
 genus Calveriosoma Mortensen, 1934 - two species 
 genus Hapalosoma Mortensen, 1903b - four species 
 Sub-family Hygrosomatinae Smith & Wright, 1990
 genus Hygrosoma Mortensen, 1903b - three species 
 Sub-family Sperosomatinae Smith & Wright, 1990
 genus Sperosoma Koehler, 1897 - 11 species 
 genus Tromikosoma Mortensen, 1903 - six species 
 genus Retzneiosoma Kroh, 2005 †

"†" means an extinct taxon.

References

 
Extant Middle Jurassic first appearances